Laska Winter (August 28, 1905 – August 8, 1980) was an American film actress active during the silent and early sound era. She was also known as Winter Blossom.

Filmography

 What Ho, the Cook (1921)
 The Thief of Bagdad (1924)
 The Marriage Cheat (1924)
 Justice of the Far North (1925)
 Tides of Passion (1925)
 Shipwrecked (1926)
 Rocking Moon (1926)
 The Tender Hour (1927)
 The Night of Love (1927)
 The Satin Woman (1927)
 Fashion Madness (1928)
 The Rescue (1929)
 Seven Footprints to Satan (1929)
 The Mysterious Dr. Fu Manchu (1929)
 Frozen Justice (1929)
 Chinatown After Dark (1931)
 The Rainbow Trail (1932)
 The Painted Woman (1932)

References

Bibliography
 Munden, Kenneth White. The American Film Institute Catalog of Motion Pictures Produced in the United States, Part 1. University of California Press, 1997.

External links

1905 births
1980 deaths
American film actresses
American silent film actresses
20th-century American actresses
Actresses from St. Louis